Table tennis events at the 2009 Southeast Asian Games took place in the Convention Hall, National University, Vientiane, Laos from 8 to 15 December 2009.

Medalists

Medal table by country

References

External links
Southeast Asian Games Official

2009
Southeast Asian Games
2009 Southeast Asian Games events
2009 in table tennis
Vientiane